Personalism is an intellectual stance that emphasizes the importance of human persons. Personalism exists in many different versions, and this makes it somewhat difficult to define as a philosophical and theological movement. Friedrich Schleiermacher first used the term personalism in print in 1799. One can trace the concept back to earlier thinkers in various parts of the world.

Overview
Writing in the Stanford Encyclopedia of Philosophy, Thomas D. Williams and Jan Olof Bengtsson cite a plurality of "schools" holding to a "personalist" ethic and "Weltanschauung", arguing:

Thus, according to Williams, one ought to keep in mind that although there may be dozens of theorists and social activists in the West adhering to the rubric "personalism," their particular foci may, in fact, be asymptotic, and even diverge at material junctures.

Berdyaev's personalism
Nikolai Alexandrovich Berdyaev (1874–1948) was a Russian religious and political philosopher who emphasized human freedom, subjectivity and creativity.

Mounier's personalism

In France, philosopher Emmanuel Mounier (1905–1950) was the leading proponent of personalism, around which he founded the review Esprit, which exists to this day. Under Jean-Marie Domenach's direction, it criticized the use of torture during the Algerian War. Personalism was seen as an alternative to both liberalism and Marxism, which respected human rights and the human personality without indulging in excessive collectivism. Mounier's personalism had an important influence in France, including in political movements, such as Marc Sangnier's Ligue de la jeune République (Young Republic League) founded in 1912.

Catholic personalism

Following on the writings of Dorothy Day, a distinctively Christian personalism developed in the 20th century. Its main theorist was the Polish philosopher Karol Wojtyła (later Pope John Paul II). In his work, Love and Responsibility, first published in 1960, Wojtyła proposed what he termed 'the personalistic norm':

This brand of personalism has come to be known as "Thomistic" because of its efforts to square modern notions regarding the person with the teachings of Thomas Aquinas. Wojtyła was influenced by the ethical personalism of German phenomenologist Max Scheler.

A first principle of Christian personalism is that persons are not to be used, but to be respected and loved. In Gaudium et spes, the Second Vatican Council formulated what has come to be considered the key expression of this personalism: "man is the only creature on earth that God willed for its own sake and he cannot fully find himself except through a sincere gift of himself".

This formula for self-fulfillment offers a key for overcoming the dichotomy frequently felt between personal "realization" and the needs or demands of social life. Personalism also implies inter-personalism, as Benedict XVI stresses in Caritas in Veritate:

Boston personalism
Personalism flourished in the early 20th century at Boston University in a movement known as Boston personalism led by theologian Borden Parker Bowne. Bowne emphasized the person as the fundamental category for explaining reality and asserted that only persons are real. He stood in opposition to certain forms of materialism which would describe persons as mere particles of matter. For example, against the argument that persons are insignificant specks of dust in the vast universe, Bowne would say that it is impossible for the entire universe to exist apart from a person to experience it. Ontologically speaking, the person is "larger" than the universe because the universe is but one small aspect of the person who experiences it. Personalism affirms the existence of the soul. Most personalists assert that God is real and that God is a person (or as in Christian trinitarianism, three 'persons', although it is important to note that the nonstandard meaning of the word 'person' in this theological context is significantly different from Bowne's usage).

Bowne also held that persons have value (see axiology, value theory, and ethics). In declaring the absolute value of personhood, he stood firmly against certain forms of philosophical naturalism (including social Darwinism) which sought to reduce the value of persons. He also stood against certain forms of positivism which sought to render ethical and theological discourse meaningless and dismiss talk of God a priori.

Georgia Harkness was a major Boston personalist theologian. Francis John McConnell was a major second-generation advocate of Boston personalism who sought to apply the philosophy to social problems of his time.

California personalism
George Holmes Howison taught a metaphysical theory called personal idealism or California personalism. Howison maintained that both impersonal, monistic idealism and materialism run contrary to the moral freedom experienced by persons. To deny the freedom to pursue the ideals of truth, beauty, and "benignant love" is to undermine every profound human venture, including science, morality, and philosophy. Thus, even the personalistic idealism of Borden Parker Bowne and Edgar S. Brightman and the realistic personal theism of Thomas Aquinas are inadequate, for they make finite persons dependent for their existence upon an infinite Person and support this view by an unintelligible doctrine of creatio ex nihilo.

The Personal Idealism of Howison was explained in his book The Limits of Evolution and Other Essays Illustrating the Metaphysical Theory of Personal Idealism. Howison created a radically democratic notion of personal idealism that extended all the way to God, who was no more the ultimate monarch, no longer the only ruler and creator of the universe, but the ultimate democrat in eternal relation to other eternal persons. Howison found few disciples among the religious, for whom his thought was heretical; the non-religious, on the other hand, considered his proposals too religious; only J. M. E. McTaggart's idealist atheism or Thomas Davidson's apeirotheism seem to resemble Howison's personal idealism.

Critical Personalism 
Critical personalism is a German development. Based on humanistic considerations (e.g. Spaemann), African Theories on Personhood (e.g. Wiredu) receptions of communitarian theories (e.g. Taylor) and empirical findings of developmental, social and personality psychology it addresses the issue of the development of personhood in community. Each person does not only reach a certain position within community but also forms an individual personality over his or her life span. In doing so, they determine a relationship to their selves and to other people. The development of personality appears as a way to take responsibility in community. Communities are thought of as by nature are infinitely diverse associations, which are not characterised by fixed values, but rather by the fact that they constantly communicate about values as they constantly arise due to actual praxis. On the basis of discourse ethics (Habermas, Apel) and the methodology of critical mediation, critical personalism in given social contexts reflects on communication practices and the societal conditions for personality development.

Antecedents and influence
Philosopher Immanuel Kant, though not formally considered a personalist, made an important contribution to the personalist cause by declaring that a person is not to be valued merely as a means to the ends of other people, but that he possesses dignity (an absolute inner worth) and is to be valued as an end in himself.

Catholic philosopher and theologian John Henry Newman, has been posited as a main proponent of personalism by John Crosby of Franciscan University in his book Personalist Papers. Crosby notes Newman's personal approach to faith, as outlined in Grammar of Assent as a main source of Newman's personalism.

Martin Luther King Jr. was greatly influenced by personalism in his studies at Boston University. King came to agree with the position that only personality is real.  It solidified his understanding of God as a personal god. It also gave him a metaphysical basis for his belief that all human personality has dignity and worth.

Paul Ricœur explicitly sought to support personalist movement by developing its theoretical foundation and expanding it with a new personalist social ethic. However, he later had significant disagreements with Mounier and criticized other personalist writers for insufficient conceptual clarity. Ricœur also disagreed with the other personalists in asserting the significance of justice as a value in its own right and gave this primary in the public sphere, whereas Mounier characterized all relationships including public and political ones in terms of love and friendship.

Pope John Paul II was also influenced by the personalism advocated by Christian existentialist philosopher Søren Kierkegaard. Before his election to the Roman papacy, he wrote Person and Act (sometimes mistranslated as The Acting Person), a philosophical work suffused with personalism. Though he remained well within the traditional stream of Catholic social and individual morality, his explanation of the origins of moral norms, as expressed in his encyclicals on economics and on sexual morality, for instance, was largely drawn from a personalist perspective. His writings as Roman pontiff, of course, influenced a generation of Catholic theologians since who have taken up personalist perspectives on the theology of the family and social order.

Notable personalists

 Randall Auxier
 Willem Banning
 Edgar S. Brightman
 Borden Parker Bowne
 Thomas O. Buford
 Dorothy Day
 Ralph Tyler Flewelling
 George Holmes Howison
 Bogumil Gacka
 Albert C. Knudson
 Edvard Kocbek
 Milan Komar
 Edwin Lewis
 John Macmurray
 Gabriel Marcel
 Peter Maurin
 J. M. E. McTaggart
 Walter George Muelder
 A. J. Muste
 Ngô Đình Diệm
 Ngô Đình Nhu
 Madame Ngô Đình Nhu
 Nikolay Lossky
 Pope John Paul II (Karol Wojtyła)
 Constantin Rădulescu-Motru
 Charles Renouvier
 Herman Van Rompuy
 Denis de Rougemont
 Francisco de Sá Carneiro, Prime Minister of Portugal
 Robert Spaemann
 William Stern
 F. C. S. Schiller
 Juan Domingo Perón
 Eva Duarte
 Gustav Teichmüller
 Pierre Trudeau, Prime Minister of Canada
 Feliks Koneczny
 Max Stirner

See also

 Personalist Labor Revolutionary Party (Can Lao Party), a South Vietnamese party founded and led by Ngô Đình Nhu for use as an instrument of control for the presidency of his brother Ngô Đình Diệm
 Charles Liebman on Jewish personalism
 Existential Thomism
 Francisco Rolão Preto
 Juan Manuel Burgos
 Christian and atheistic existentialism
 Speculative theism
 The Personalist, a journal dedicated to personalism from about 1920 to 1979, now the Pacific Philosophical Quarterly
 Individualism
 Communitarianism

Notes

References

Further reading

 
 
 
 Burrow, R. (1999). Afrikan American Contributions to Personalism. Encounter-Indianapolis-, 60, 145–168.

External links

Personalism: a critical introduction By Rufus Burrow
Emmanuel Mounier and Personalism
Personalism: A Brief Account. Department of Philosophy, University of Central Florida, includes link to personalism bibliography
Personalism Magazine (Lublin, Poland) 
History of Personalism - Acton Institute - also articles on Economic Personalism
A Presentation of Personalism  by Bogumił Gacka

Christian theological movements
Conceptions of self
Personhood